Bill Gilmour is a Scots television director. He was born on 17 March 1939 in the small town of Peebles in the Tweed Valley of the Scottish Borders. He went to Ealing Art College in West London, where he specialised in photography, while attending Frank Auerbach's drawing classes. He joined Scottish Television in 1960 as a camera operator, moving after four years to floor managing, before joining Granada Television in 1967. Gilmour began directing in 1972.

Gilmour directed the plays Happy Returns by Brian Clarke, Some Enchanted Evening by C. P. Taylor, and The Game by Paul Pender. He directed episodes of the off-beat detective television series Strangers and the 'spin off' series, Bulman by writers Murray Smith, Paul Wheeler and Eddie Boyd. He directed many episodes of Sam, The Spoils of War (TV series) and This Year Next Year, series written by John Finch, which were shot in studio and on location in the Lake District and the Yorkshire Dales. Gilmour's work continued with Cribb, a Victorian Scotland Yard detective drama based on the novels by Peter Lovesey and House of Caradus, a series set in a fine art auction house, as well as twenty-seven episodes of Crown Court, a courtroom drama in which a case is played before a jury drawn from members of the public. Over the years, he directed one hundred and eighty-six episodes of Britain's longest running soap opera, Coronation Street.

In the 1970s, Gilmour directed episodes of the comedy Hows Your Father, written by John Stevenson. He produced and directed The Cuckoo Waltz, written by Geoffrey Lancashire, a comedy series about a young married couple and their lodger.

He directed twenty-six episodes of Loving for ABC Television in New York, nine episodes of EastEnders for the BBC, a comedy William and Wilma for Gemini Films and WDR in Cologne and Hollyoaks for Channel 4.

In Manchester, he directed Maureen Pryor in a stage production of Before Breakfast by Eugene O'Neill.

Gilmour directed twenty-six episodes of Allsorts continuing an interest in children's reading. With Three Bob for D-Day, he went on the fortieth anniversary of D-Day to Normandy with a coach full of Liverpool riflemen to make two films. He made Working in a large psychiatric hospital. Playing is a film on children's street songs. He directed an edition of World in Action, the story being, the less you earn the higher a proportion goes in tax.

He contributed an essay to the book, Granada Television, The First Generation edited by Michael Cox, John Finch, and Marjorie Giles.

Gilmour lives in Edinburgh, enjoys long distance single-handed sailing, Himalayan trekking and watching Indian tigers.

External links

1939 births
Living people
British television directors